Knattspyrnufélagið Þróttur, also referred to as Þróttur Reykjavík or Throttur FC, is a sports club from Reykjavík in Iceland.During the 2016 campaign they will be competing in the following competitions: Úrvalsdeild, Cup, League Cup.

Results summary

Results by matchday

Matches

External links
Official site (Icelandic only)

Icelandic football club seasons
Knat